Tandragee is a town in County Armagh, Northern Ireland. It is built on a hillside overlooking the Cusher River, in the civil parish of Ballymore and the historic barony of Orior Lower.

Earlier spellings of the name include Tanderagee and Tonregee. It had a population of 3,486 people in the 2011 Census.

History
Overlooking the town is Tandragee Castle. Originally the seat of the Chief of the Name of the O'Hanlon Irish clan and Lord of Orior, the Castle and surrounding countryside were confiscated and granted to Oliver St John and his heirs during the Tudor conquest of Ireland and the Plantation of Ulster.

According to D. J. O'Donoghue's account of his 1825 Irish tour, Sir Walter Scott was fascinated by the life and career of Redmond O'Hanlon, a local Rapparee leader. Hoping to make him the protagonist of an adventure novel, Scott corresponded with Lady Olivia Sparrow, an Anglo-Irish landowner whose estates included Tandragee. Although Scott asked Lady Olivia to obtain as much information as possible about O'Hanlon, he was forced to give up on the project after finding documentation too scanty.

Tandragee Castle was rebuilt in about 1837 for The 6th Duke of Manchester. Today, its grounds are home to the Tayto potato-crisp factory.

In 2000, Tandragee was scene of the Murders of Andrew Robb and David McIlwaine, two teenaged local Protestant men who were unaffiliated with an paramilitary organization, as part of an ongoing Loyalist feud.

Education 
Tandragee Primary School
Tandragee Junior High School
Tandragee Nursery
Button Moon Play Group

Sport 
Tandragee Rovers play in the Mid-Ulster Football League. There is a golf course within the grounds of Tandragee Castle, within walking distance of the main street. It is 5,589 metres, par 71, and a hilly parkland course.

Despite Tandragee's Protestant majority, the Gaelic Athletic Association also has a presence near the town. Tandragee's Gaelic football team is named "The Redmond O'Hanlons", after the 17th century rapparee of the same name.

Industry and transport

Thomas Sinton opened a mill in town in the 1880s, an expansion of his firm from its original premises at nearby Laurelvale – a model village which he built. Sintons' mill, at the banks of the River Cusher, remained in production until the 1990s.m The potato-crisp company Tayto has a factory and offices beside Tandragee Castle. It offers guided tours.

Tanderagee railway station opened on 6 January 1852 and was shut on 4 January 1965.

Northern Ireland Electricity has an interconnector to County Louth in the Republic of Ireland from the outskirts of the town.

Demography

2011 Census
Tandragee had a population of 3,486 people (1,382 households) in the 2011 Census. Of these:
 23.26% were under 16 years old and 12.62% were aged 65 and above;
 50.06% of the population were male and 49.94% were female; and
 81.84% were from a Protestant background and 11.70% were from a Roman Catholic background

2001 Census
Tandragee is classified as an intermediate settlement by the NI Statistics and Research Agency (NISRA) (i.e. with population between 2,050 and 4,500 people).
On Census day (29 April 2001) there were 3,050 people living in Tandragee. Of these:
24.9% were aged under 16 years and 14.3% were aged 60 and over
48.0% of the population were male and 50.0% were female
86.9% were from a Protestant background and 10.5% were from a Roman Catholic background
2.0% of people aged 16–74 were unemployed.
For more details see: NI Neighbourhood Information Service

See also
 The Tandragee Idol

References 

Villages in County Armagh
Civil parish of Ballymore, County Armagh